Lataif-e-sitta  are special organs of perception in Sufi spiritual psychology, subtle human capacities for experience and action. Depending on context, the lataif are also understood to be the corresponding qualities of that experience or action.

The underlying Arabic word latifa (singular) means "subtlety" and the phrase Lataif-e-sitta means "six subtleties" (although the number of lataif can differ depending on the specific Sufi tradition).   All lataif (plural) together are understood to make up the human "subtle body", known as the Jism Latif.

Realizing (or activating or awakening or "illuminating") the experience of  the individual lataif (and thereby the Jism Latif as a whole) is considered to be a central part of the comprehensive spiritual development that produces the Sufi ideal of a Complete Man (Al-Insān al-Kāmil).

Different interpretations

Descriptions and interpretations of the lataif differ depending on the specific Sufi tradition and exponent representing it. In addition, individual Sufi teachers (see Sheikh (Sufism)) sometimes interpret aspects of  lataif theory and practice according to how the lataif have been uniquely revealed to them.

In general, there are at least three major historical interpretations of the lataif:
 that derived from the Kubrāwī order, described in the writings of Najm al-Din Razi (1177-1256) and Ala ud-Daula Simnani (Semnani) (1261-1336), which views the Lataif as potential psychospiritual organs/capacities that can be realized as progressive stages in those undergoing spiritual development; 
 that derived from the Mujaddidiyya branch of the Naqshbandi order, described in the writings of  Ahmad Sirhindi (1564-1624), which views the Lataif as psychospiritual organs/capacities that are potential receptors of Divine energy when activated in those undergoing spiritual development;  
 that derived from the "Punjab Tradition" within the Naqshbandi order, described in the writings of  Ikbal Ali Shah (1894-1969) and  Idries Shah (1924-1996), which views the Lataif as actual human psychospiritual organs/capacities that are implicit in everyday life and made explicit in those undergoing spiritual development.

Kubrāwī lataif

According to the view of the Kubrawi order there are seven lataif. They are understood cosmologically as "descending" levels through which reality is created and structured. In the process of spiritual development, the individual Sufi is understood to "ascend" to and through these levels progressively (see ontological Arcs of Descent and Ascent in Sufism). The attainment of each level is a stage associated with the activation/realization of a corresponding spiritual organ/capacity, interpreted symbolically through Islamic cosmology and the prophets and messengers in Islam.

In ascending order they are:
 Latifa Qalabiya ("Mold"), associated with an experience of the color black, represents the acquisition of a new organ, an embryonic subtle body. It is interpreted symbolically as "the Adam of one's being", since Adam was the first human being.  
 Latifa Nafsiya ("Soul"), color blue, is an organ that corresponds to the animal soul and is a testing ground for struggle with desires and passions. It is interpreted symbolically as "the Noah of one's being", since Noah faced the same situation in dealing with the hostility of his people. 
 Latifa Qalbiya ("Heart"), color red, is the organ that will develop to become the True Ego, the real personal individuality. It is interpreted symbolically as "the Abraham of one's being", since the prophet Abraham historically represents the establishment of real religion.
 Latifa Sirriya ("Secret"), color white, is an organ of superconsciousness. It is interpreted symbolically as "the Moses of one's being", since the prophet Moses participated in spiritual communication with God through this consciousness.
 Latifa Ruhiya ("Spirit"), color yellow, is an organ through which an individual becomes capable of acting as vice-regent of God. It is interpreted symbolically as "the David of one's being", since the prophet David fulfilled that role.
 Latifa Khafiya ("Inspiration"), color black, is the subtle organ that receives spiritual inspiration.  It is interpreted symbolically as "the Jesus of one's being", since the prophet Jesus was characteristic of such inspiration. 
 Latifa Haqqiya ("Seal"), color green, is the subtle organ that is the final achievement of spiritual development: the True Ego.  It is interpreted symbolically as "the Mohammed of one's being", since Mohammed was the final prophet.

Kubrawi Sufi Ala ud-Daula Simnani (1261-1336) describes a dhikr practice that appears to include these lataif.  The practice involves the rotation of attention and breath to different parts of the physical body, combined with recitation of a Quranic credal formula.

Naqshbandi lataif (Mujaddidiyya)

According to the view of the Mujaddidiyya branch of the Naqshbandi order there are five lataif. The reception of each latifa's spiritual energy from its corresponding cosmic realm is interpreted symbolically through the prophets and messengers in Islam, similar to the interpretation of the Kubrawi order:
 Qalb (color yellow; located below left breast) (Adam)
 Ruh (color red; located below right breast) (Abraham/Noah)
 Sirr (color white; located above left breast) (Moses)
 Khafi (color black;  located above right breast) (Jesus)
 Ikhfa (color green; located at sternum) (Mohammed)

Since, in this interpretation, the lataif all have their physical location in the chest, they are said to be "of the Heart" (Qalb, used in a different sense than the latifa named Qalb).

The lataif are opened through spiritual practice one-by-one in the foregoing order. Viewed as a progressive activation, each latifa (or progressive combination of Lataif) is considered to be a level of spiritual realization.

The method of opening each latifa typically begins with a direct transmission by Sufi teacher to student, which can include physical touch (except for women) and the disclosure of the specific one of the Names of God in Islam that is associated with the latifa. The student then continues the practice by silent dhikr of the Divine Name, focusing attention on the latifa's location; sometimes a visualization of the Name, the corresponding prophet, or the teacher is also added.

Naqshbandi lataif (Punjab tradition)

According to the Punjab tradition within the Naqshbandi order there are five lataif'":
 Qalb (color yellow; experienced in left side of the body)
 Ruh (color red; experienced in right side of the body)
 Sirr (color white; experienced below the navel)
 Khafi (color black; experienced in forehead)
 Ikhfa (color green; experienced in center of chest)

In the view of Naqshbandi author Idries Shah they are understood to be spiritual organs/capacities that also underlie ordinary forms of human consciousness. As such, they are ordinarily only known indirectly through the equivalents (or their distortions) that they pattern on the conventional mental/emotional/somatic level of  human experience.

Sufi inspired spiritual teacher Hameed Ali (A. H. Almaas) (1944-) interprets some of these equivalents (and conditioned distortions) as follows: 
 Qalb (Joy/Wanting)
 Ruh (Strength/Anger)
 Sirr (Will/Anxiety)
 Khafi (Peace/Agitation)
 Ikhfa (Compassion/Hurt)

With rare exceptions, lataif are only experienced directly (and unconditionedly) in human beings who have undergone a spiritual evolution. The spiritual process of their activation/awakening/illumination consists of various methods, singly or in combination.

One such method, a special form of tajalli ("disclosure" or "illumination"), involves joint receptivity of a latifa by Sufi teacher and student together. Another method is the direct activation, called tawajjuh ("transmission"), of the latifa by an intentional interaction between teacher and student. Yet another method, a special kind of muraqabah (meditation), includes having the student concentrate awareness on the part of the body that is related to a latifa.

 Comparison of interpretations 

History of interpretations

The spiritual experiences identified by Sufism as the lataif have their immediate historical antecedents in the Emanationism of Neoplatonism, which is known to have influenced the development of Sufism (see: Platonism in Islamic philosophy).  The Emanations of Neoplatonism, in turn, arose from the Theory of forms of Plato.

The general concept of spiritual "subtle centers" (usually three) originated within Persian Sufism: Junayd of Baghdad (835-910), Al-Ghazali (1058-1111), and Shahab al-Din Abu Hafs Umar Suhrawardi (1145-1234).

Among the earliest systematic formulations of the lataif specifically is thought to be that of Persian and Kubrawi Sufi Najm al-Din Razi (1177-1256). He proposed five lataif (at least Qalb, Ruh, Sirr, and Khafi), possibly to parallel the five inner and outer senses of the Islamic version of ancient Greek medical theory, and sought to establish a basis for them in the Quran.

The seven lataif model then followed with Persian and Kubrawi Sufi Ala ud-Daula Simnani, who added two lataif to the five of Razi – one below (Qalabiya) and one above (Haqqiya), possibly to parallel the seven ontological levels of Sufi cosmology.

From the 17th to 19th centuries, the Indian Mujaddidis, beginning with Ahmad Sirhindi (1564-1624), returned to a standardized interpretation of five experiential lataif and associated their locations with parts of the physical body.

The Punjab tradition within the Naqshbandi in the late 19th and 20th centuries continued with five lataif but identified the experience of their physical locations differently and viewed them not just as higher centers of consciousness but also as centers of ordinary consciousness not properly awakened.

Since the Divine Attributes that underlie the lataif are in principle unlimited (just as with the nominal 99 names of God in Islam), it is thought by some that the actual number of lataif'' and their potential realization by humanity might likewise be unlimited.

See also
 Al-Insān al-Kāmil
 Arcs of Descent and Ascent
 Dhikr
 Emanationism
 Illuminationism
 Muraqabah
 Tawajjuh
 Neoplatonism 
 Platonism in Islamic Philosophy 
 Subtle Body
 Sufi cosmology 
 Tajalli

References

Sufi philosophy
Sufi psychology
Spiritual faculties